Chowan County is one of the 100 counties located in the U.S. state of North Carolina. As of the 2020 census, the population was 13,708. Its county seat is Edenton. The county was created between 1668 and 1671 as Shaftesbury Precinct and later renamed Chowan Precinct. It gained county status in 1739.

History

Chowan was formed in 1670 as a precinct, originally called Shaftesbury, in Albemarle County. By 1685 it had been renamed for the Chowan Indian tribe, which lived in the northeastern part of the Carolina Colony.

Chowan County is in the northeastern section of the State and is bounded by Albemarle Sound, Chowan River, and the counties of Bertie, Hertford, Gates, and Perquimans. The present land area is 172.64 square miles and the 2000 population was 14,150.

In 1720, Edenton, which was named in honor of Governor Charles Eden, was established. In 1722 it was designated, and has continued to be, the county seat.

During the American Civil War, the Albemarle Artillery was recruited in 1862 from Chowan and Tyrrell men at Edenton by local attorney William Badham, Jr. After cannons were recast from bronze donated as bells from local courthouses and churches to arm the battery, the unit was renamed the Edenton Bell Battery.  They named their cannon: Columbia, St. Paul, Fannie Roulac, and Edenton. Two of the guns, long thought lost, have been returned to Edenton in recent years. The St. Paul and the Edenton now can be seen on display at Edenton's waterfront park.
The county was named after the historical Chowanoc American Indian tribe, also called Chowan.

Geography

It is the smallest county in North Carolina by land area and third-smallest by total area.

State and local protected sites 
 Historic Edenton
 James Iredell House

Major water bodies 
 Albemarle Sound
 Chowan River

Adjacent counties
 Gates County - north
 Perquimans County - east
 Washington County - south
 Bertie County - west
 Hertford County - northwest

Major highways
  (Concurrency with US 17)

Major infrastructure 
 Northeastern Reginal Airport

Demographics

2020 census

As of the 2020 United States census, there were 13,708 people, 6,133 households, and 3,986 families residing in the county.

2010 census
As of the census of 2010, there were 14,793 people, 5,580 households, and 4,006 families residing in the county.  The population density was 84 people per square mile (32/km2).  There were 6,443 housing units at an average density of 37 per square mile (14/km2).  The racial makeup of the county was 62.0% White, 34.3% Black or African American, 0.3% Native American, 0.4% Asian, 0.0% Pacific Islander, 1.8% from other races, and 1.2% from two or more races.  3.2% of the population were Hispanic or Latino of any race.

There were 5,580 households, out of which 30.30% had children under the age of 18 living with them, 53.00% were married couples living together, 15.70% had a female householder with no husband present, and 28.20% were non-families. 25.30% of all households were made up of individuals, and 12.10% had someone living alone who was 65 years of age or older.  The average household size was 2.48 and the average family size was 2.94.

In the county, the population was spread out, with 23.90% under the age of 18, 9.60% from 18 to 24, 24.10% from 25 to 44, 24.40% from 45 to 64, and 17.90% who were 65 years of age or older.  The median age was 40 years. For every 100 females there were 88.10 males.  For every 100 females age 18 and over, there were 84.60 males.

The median income for a household in the county was $30,928, and the median income for a family was $36,986. Males had a median income of $29,719 versus $19,826 for females. The per capita income for the county was $15,027.  About 13.70% of families and 17.60% of the population were below the poverty line, including 25.50% of those under age 18 and 16.70% of those age 65 or over.

Government and politics
Chowan County is a member of the Albemarle Commission regional council of government.

Chowan County is represented by Bobby Hanig in the 1st district of the North Carolina House State Senate.

Communities

Town
 Edenton (county seat and largest town)

Townships
 Township 1, Edenton
 Township 2, Middle
 Township 3, Upper
 Township 4, Yeopim

Census-designated places
 Arrowhead Beach
 Cape Colony
 Chowan Beach

Other unincorporated places
 Rockyhock
 Selwin
 Sign Pine
 Tyner

See also
 List of counties in North Carolina
 National Register of Historic Places listings in Chowan County, North Carolina
 North Carolina v. Mann (1830), a slave court case
 List of future Interstate Highways

References

Further reading
 Newcomer, Mabel. Economic and Social History of Chowan County, North Carolina, 1880-1915 (1917)

External links

 
 

 
1739 establishments in North Carolina
Populated places established in 1739